Anhalter Platz is a square in Munich's district 11 Milbertshofen-Am Hart in the district Am Riesenfeld.

Description 
It is located between Moosacher Straße, Riesenfeldstraße and Motorstraße. There is a playground next to it. At Anhalter Platz 3 lies the architectural monument Hochbunker Anhalter Platz.

It was named after the province of Anhalt, today part of the federal state of Saxony-Anhalt.

Until May 1972 the tram line 7, coming from Petuelring ended at Anhalter Platz.

References 

Squares in Munich
Buildings and structures in Munich